Butcher Nunatak is a nunatak at the south end of the Birchall Peaks,  southwest of Swarm Peak, in the Ford Ranges of Marie Byrd Land. It was mapped by the United States Geological Survey from surveys and from U.S. Navy air photos (1959–65), and named by the Advisory Committee on Antarctic Names for Robert S. Butcher, builder, U.S. Navy, at Byrd Station in 1967.

References 

Nunataks of Marie Byrd Land